White Oak Park is a  county park in Allegheny County, Pennsylvania, United States. It is a part of the county's  network of nine distinct parks.

References

External links
 

Parks in the Pittsburgh metropolitan area
Parks in Allegheny County, Pennsylvania
County parks in the United States